Fiat is an unincorporated community in Penn Township, Jay County, Indiana.

History
A post office was established at Fiat in 1881, and remained in operation until it was discontinued in 1926. The political issue of United States Notes (fiat money) likely caused the community's name to be selected.

Historic site
Known as the Rebecca Rankin Round Barn, it was built in 1908, and it is listed on the National Register of Historic Places.

In popular culture
A portion of Harry Turtledove's science fiction novel Worldwar: In the Balance takes place in Fiat.

References

Unincorporated communities in Jay County, Indiana
Unincorporated communities in Indiana